Kuhlmey may refer to:

Detachment Kuhlmey, temporary unit of the German Luftwaffe during World War II
Kurt Kuhlmey (1913–1993), one of the most famous Stuka pilots of World War II
Rainer Kuhlmey, retired German tennis player